Jairo Swirsky (born 15 May 1968 in Brazil) is a Brazilian football manager.

References

Brazilian football managers
Living people
1968 births
Brazilian expatriate football managers
Expatriate football managers in Israel
Bnei Sakhnin F.C. managers
Israeli Premier League managers